Alderson Historic District is a national historic district located at Alderson, Greenbrier County and Monroe County, West Virginia.  The district encompasses 196 contributing buildings and three contributing sites located in the commercial district and surrounding residential section.  They are predominantly 19th and early 20th century frame detached residences and masonry commercial buildings including notable examples of the Federal, Greek Revival, and Queen Anne styles.  Notable buildings include the Woodson Mohler Grocery building, Johnson and Gwinn warehouse, Greenbrier Mill, First National Bank building, Alderson's Store, Chesapeake and Ohio depot, U.S. Post Office, and the City Hall (1939).  The Alderson Ferry Site is for the ferry established 1789.  Located in the district is the separately listed Alderson Bridge.

It was listed on the National Register of Historic Places in 1993.

Gallery

References

External links
All of the following are located in Alderson, Greenbrier County, WV:

Historic districts in Greenbrier County, West Virginia
Federal architecture in West Virginia
Greek Revival architecture in West Virginia
Queen Anne architecture in West Virginia
Buildings and structures in Greenbrier County, West Virginia
Buildings and structures in Monroe County, West Virginia
National Register of Historic Places in Greenbrier County, West Virginia
Commercial buildings on the National Register of Historic Places in West Virginia
National Register of Historic Places in Monroe County, West Virginia
Historic districts in Monroe County, West Virginia
Historic districts on the National Register of Historic Places in West Virginia
1789 establishments in Virginia